William Champion may refer to:

 William Champion (metallurgist) (1709–1789), early producer of zinc in the United Kingdom
 William Julius Champion Jr. (1880–1972), popularizer of Kalah
 Will Champion (born 1978), drummer for Coldplay

See also
Bill Champion (disambiguation)